William Carpenter is the author of three books of poetry, The Hours of Morning, Poems 1976-1979 (University Press of Virginia, 1981), Rain (Northeastern University Press, 1985), Speaking Fire at Stones (Tilbury House, 1992), and (to date) three novels, A Keeper of Sheep (Milkweed Editions, 1996), The Wooden Nickel (Little, Brown & Co., 2002), and Silence (Islandport Press, 2021).

Biography
Born and raised in New England, he earned his B.A. from Dartmouth and a Ph.D. from the University of Minnesota. He began publishing poetry in 1976, and won the Associated Writing Program's Contemporary Poetry Award in 1980. In 1985 he received the Samuel French Morse Prize and a National Endowment for the Arts grant. He moved to Maine in 1972 to help found the College of the Atlantic, a school dedicated to human ecology and the environment, where he served on the faculty for 48 years and retired in 2019.

References

20th-century American novelists
Poets from Maine
University of Minnesota alumni
Dartmouth College alumni
Novelists from Maine
Living people
College of the Atlantic faculty
1940 births
21st-century American novelists
20th-century American poets
21st-century American poets
American male novelists
American male poets
20th-century American male writers
21st-century American male writers